The Maui Nui finch (Telespiza ypsilon) is an extinct member of the genus Telespiza in the family Fringillidae. It was endemic to the Hawaiian islands of Molokai and Maui. It is only known from fossil remains and likely became extinct before the first Europeans visited Hawaii in 1778.

Extinction
Due to its early extinction, very little is known about this species. It is only known from a few bones found in caves. It appears that this species began to go extinct when the first Polynesians settlers came to the islands. They cleared some of the land for farming and introduced species for which the native birds had no defence. According to fossil records, their numbers declined rapidly in the early 12th century. It has been speculated that this species' visits to lower elevations was its undoing due to contact with avian diseases and pests. Today, only about sixty percent of Hawaii has not been drastically altered. Many avian diseases and parasites also pose a major threat to Hawai'i's native forest birds.

References
 James, Helen F., & Olson, Storrs L. (1991). Descriptions of thirty-two new species of birds from the Hawaiian Islands: Part II. Passeriformes. Ornithological Monographs 46. The American Ornithologists' Union, Washington D.C.

Extinct birds of Hawaii
Late Quaternary prehistoric birds
Telespiza
Holocene extinctions
Biota of Maui
Biota of Molokai
Taxa named by Helen F. James